Codonorchis is a genus of flowering plants from the orchid family, Orchidaceae. There are two known species:

Codonorchis canisioi Mansf. - Brazil (State of Rio Grande do Sul)
Codonorchis lessonii (d'Urv.) Lindl. - Argentina, Chile, Falkland Islands

See also 
 List of Orchidaceae genera

References 

 Pridgeon, A.M., Cribb, P.J., Chase, M.A. & Rasmussen, F. eds. (2003). Genera Orchidacearum 3. Oxford Univ. Press
 Berg Pana, H. 2005. Handbuch der Orchideen-Namen. Dictionary of Orchid Names. Dizionario dei nomi delle orchidee. Ulmer, Stuttgart

External links 

Orchidoideae genera
Orchidoideae